Horeke is a settlement in the upper reaches of the Hokianga Harbour in Northland, New Zealand.  Kohukohu is just across the harbour. The Horeke basalts are located near the town, and can be viewed on an easy stroll through the Wairere Boulders, a commercial park.

The town is at the western end of the  km (54 mi) Pou Herenga Tai - Twin Coast Cycle Trail from Opua, which opened fully in 2017.

History and culture

European settlement
The town was initially called Deptford after the Royal Navy shipyard in England. It was one of the first places settled by Europeans in New Zealand, with shipbuilding established in the late 1820s.

David Ramsay and Gordon Davies Browne came from Sydney to set up a trading post and shipbuilding settlement about 1826. Three ships were built - a 40-ton schooner called Enterprise, a 140-ton brigantine called New Zealander, and the 394 (or 392)-ton barque Sir George Murray, but the firm went bankrupt in 1830.

The Wesleyan missionary John Hobbs opened Māngungu Mission, about a mile from the shipyard, in 1828.

Thomas McDonnell's station in Horeke was the centre of timber trading in the Hokianga in the 1830s.

Marae

Horeke has six Ngāpuhi marae:
 Mataitaua Marae and Ngāti Toro meeting house is a meeting place of Ngāti Toro.
 Motukiore Marae and Arohamauora meeting house is a meeting place of Ngāti Toro, Te Māhurehure and Te Ngahengahe.
 Paremata Marae and meeting house is a meeting place of Ngāti Hao and Ngāti Toro.
 Piki te Aroha or Rāhiri Marae and Whakapono meeting house is a meeting place of Ngāi Tāwake ki te Moana, Ngāi Tāwake ki te Tuawhenua, Ngāti Hao and Ngāti Toro.
 Puketawa Marae is a meeting place of Ngāi Tāwake ki te Moana, Ngāti Hao, Ngāti Toro and Te Honihoni.
 Tauratumaru Marae and Tahere meeting house is a meeting place of Ngāi Tāwake ki te Moana, Ngāti Toro, Tauratumaru, Te Honihoni and Te Popoto.

In October 2020, the Government committed $441,900 from the Provincial Growth Fund to upgrade Mataitaua Marae, creating 10 jobs. It also committed $496,514 to upgrade the Puketawa Marae, creating 22 jobs.

The Maraeroa community, east of Horeke, has two Ngāpuhi marae:
 Rangatahi Marae and Maraeroa meeting house is a meeting place of Ngāti Toro, Te Honihoni, Te Popoto and Ngahengahe.
 Mokonuiārangi Marae and meeting house is a meeting place of Ngāi Tāwake ki te Moana, Ngāti Toro and Te Ngahengahe.

In October 2020, the Government committed $471,100 to upgrade Rangatahi Marae, creating 15 jobs.

Demographics 
Horeke's meshblock (0022000, which extends to the Utukura River and Ruapapaka Island) had these census results -

Omahuta Forest-Horeke covers the upper Hokianga Harbour.

Omahuta Forest-Horeke had a population of 1,056 at the 2018 New Zealand census, an increase of 168 people (18.9%) since the 2013 census, and an increase of 39 people (3.8%) since the 2006 census. There were 333 households, comprising 522 males and 531 females, giving a sex ratio of 0.98 males per female. The median age was 40.2 years (compared with 37.4 years nationally), with 264 people (25.0%) aged under 15 years, 159 (15.1%) aged 15 to 29, 462 (43.8%) aged 30 to 64, and 171 (16.2%) aged 65 or older.

Ethnicities were 50.9% European/Pākehā, 65.1% Māori, 3.7% Pacific peoples, 1.7% Asian, and 0.6% other ethnicities. People may identify with more than one ethnicity.

The percentage of people born overseas was 6.8, compared with 27.1% nationally.

Although some people chose not to answer the census's question about religious affiliation, 40.6% had no religion, 35.2% were Christian, 14.2% had Māori religious beliefs, 0.3% were Buddhist and 1.1% had other religions.

Of those at least 15 years old, 69 (8.7%) people had a bachelor's or higher degree, and 192 (24.2%) people had no formal qualifications. The median income was $18,600, compared with $31,800 nationally. 39 people (4.9%) earned over $70,000 compared to 17.2% nationally. The employment status of those at least 15 was that 264 (33.3%) people were employed full-time, 117 (14.8%) were part-time, and 75 (9.5%) were unemployed.

Education 
Horeke School is a coeducational contributing primary (years 1-8) school has a roll of  students as of  The school was established in 1920.

Notes

External links

Welcome to the Town of Horeke

Hokianga
Populated places in the Northland Region